Fériana is a town and commune in the Kasserine Governorate, Tunisia. As of 2004 it had a population of 26,504. It is 35 km from Kasserine and 75 from Gafsa.

Located in the southern part of the Tunisian ridge, at 745 meters of altitude, it is one of the highest cities of Tunisia. It has a semi-arid climate in cool winter and receives about 350 millimeters of rain per year. Vegetation is scarce except a few steppes of alfa (spartum lygum) and vestiges of an Aleppo pine forest.

See also
List of cities in Tunisia

References

Populated places in Kasserine Governorate
Communes of Tunisia
Tunisia geography articles needing translation from French Wikipedia